Zulunigma is a monotypic genus of South African jumping spiders containing the single species, Zulunigma incognita. It was first described by Wanda Wesołowska & M. S. Cumming in 2011, and is found in South Africa. It was originally called Aenigma, but this name was given to at least three other animal genera, and it was replaced by Zulunigma in 2011.

References

Endemic fauna of South Africa
Salticidae
Salticidae genera
Spiders of South Africa
Taxa named by Wanda Wesołowska